Quzlijeh (also Romanized as Qūzlījeh; also known as Qezlījeh) is a village in Sardrud-e Sofla Rural District, Sardrud District, Razan County, Hamadan Province, Iran. At the 2006 census, its population was 89, in 22 families.

References 

Populated places in Razan County